Nicoletia is a genus of silverfish in the family Nicoletiidae. As of 2007, it contains the former members of two other genera.

Species 

 Anelpistina acanthocruris Espinasa & Fisher, 2005
 Anelpistina anophtalma (Bilimek, 1867)
 Anelpistina ariasae Espinasa, 2005
 Anelpistina arubana (Mendes, 1986)
 Anelpistina asymmetrica (Espinasa, 2000)
 Anelpistina bolivari (Wygodzinsky, 1946)
 Anelpistina boneti (Wygodzinsky, 1946)
 Anelpistina carrizalensis (Wygodzinsky, 1946)
 Anelpistina cuaxilotla Espinasa, 1999
 Anelpistina decui (Wygodzinsky & Hollinger, 1977)
 Anelpistina doradoi Espinasa & Alpheis, 2001
 Anelpistina inappendicata Espinasa, 1999
 Anelpistina mexicana (Espinasa, 1992)
 Anelpistina miranda (Silvestri, 1902)
 Anelpistina negreai (Wygodzinsky & Hollinger, 1977)
 Anelpistina parkerae (Espinasa & Rishmawi, 2005)
 Anelpistina puertoricensis Espinasa & Alpheis, 2003
 Anelpistina quinterensis (Paclt, 1979)
 Anelpistina ramosi (Wygodzinsky, 1959)
 Anelpistina ruckeri (Silvestri, 1905)
 Anelpistina spelaea (Galan, 2000)
 Anelpistina weyrauchi (Wygodzinsky, 1959)
 Anelpistina wheeleri (Silvestri, 1905)

References

Insect genera
Taxa named by Filippo Silvestri